Garnet Charwat (born 7 June 1967) is a Nicaraguan swimmer. She competed in two events at the 1980 Summer Olympics.

References

External links
 

1967 births
Living people
Nicaraguan female swimmers
Olympic swimmers of Nicaragua
Swimmers at the 1980 Summer Olympics
Place of birth missing (living people)
20th-century Nicaraguan women
21st-century Nicaraguan women